A staff clerk is a professional specialist clerk in the British Army who is a member of an administrative corps, as opposed to a unit clerk, who is a member of the corps or regiment in which he or she works and is trained first and foremost in the duties of that unit (as an infantryman, for instance).

Staff clerks predominantly work in headquarters units alongside staff officers, hence the name. Clerks working in headquarters were consolidated into the Army Service Corps (later Royal Army Service Corps) during the Boer War. In the McLeod Reorganisation of Army Logistics, staff clerks were transferred to the Royal Army Ordnance Corps in 1965.

In 1992 they again transferred, to the Staff and Personnel Support Branch of the Adjutant General's Corps and were merged with unit clerks.

Footnotes

British Army specialisms
clerk